The year 1807 in architecture involved some significant events.

Events
 John Smith is appointed official city architect of Aberdeen in Scotland.
 St Mark's Basilica in Venice is consecrated as a cathedral.

Buildings and structures

Buildings

 The church of San Pietro di Cremeno, Genoa, Italy, is built.
 The Templo de la Virgen del Carmen church in Celaya, Guanajuato, Mexico, designed by Francisco Eduardo Tresguerras, is completed.
 Saint Petersburg Manege (riding school), designed by Giacomo Quarenghi, is completed.
 "Old Academy" building for Perth Academy, Scotland, designed by Robert Reid, is completed.
 Chester City Club in England, designed by Thomas Harrison, is built as the Commercial Coffee Room.
 Huguang Guild Hall in Beijing, is built.
 Royal Crescent, Brighton, England (begun 1798) is completed.
 In Lincoln County, Maine, the Nichols-Sortwell House and Castle Tucker, examples of federal architecture, are built at Wiscasset's seaport on the Sheepscot River.

Awards
 Grand Prix de Rome, architecture: Jean-Nicolas Huyot.

Births

 April 28 – Alan Stevenson, Scottish lighthouse engineer (died 1865)
 September 26 – John Hayward, English architect (died 1891)

Deaths
 February 22 – John Carr, English architect (born 1723)

References

Architecture
Years in architecture
19th-century architecture